Walter de Lacy may refer to:

Walter de Lacy (died 1085), Norman nobleman
Walter de Lacy, Lord of Meath (c. 1172–1241)